Graceland Wedding Chapel is a wedding chapel located in Las Vegas, Nevada that has been the site of many celebrity weddings. It is one of the oldest wedding chapels in Las Vegas and claims to be the first chapel ever to conduct weddings performed by Elvis impersonators.

History and description 
Built as a private residence in 1927, it has been operating as a wedding chapel since at least 1939 when owner Ollie McKee began performing ceremonies. By the early 1940s it was called Gretna Green Wedding Chapel, named after the Scottish wedding destination of Gretna Green. Elvis Presley visited the chapel in 1967, while planning his wedding to Priscilla Beaulieu. According to Frommer's, Presley himself gave the owners of the chapel permission to use the Graceland name, but in fact it was not renamed until after the singer's death, the same year that Elvis-themed weddings began there.

The chapel is a small building, in the New England style, with a white picket fence. It holds 30 people.

In film 
Fools Rush In (1997)
Fear and Loathing in Las Vegas (1998)
The Amazing Race 15 (2009)
The Hangover (2009)

Notable marriages 
 
David Harbour & Lily Allen (2020)

See also 
List of wedding chapels in Las Vegas

References

External links 

Buildings and structures in Las Vegas
Wedding chapels in the Las Vegas Valley
Landmarks in Nevada
Elvis Presley